Padmanabhan V Sivadas (born 25 November 1930) was an Indian cricketer. He was a left-handed batsman who played for Travancore-Cochin. He was born in Haripad.

Career

Sivadas made a single first-class appearance for the team, during the 1951–52 season, against Mysore. From the lower order, he scored 5 runs in the first innings in which he batted, and a single run in the second, as Travancore-Cochin lost the match by an innings margin.

References

External links
Padmanabhan Sivadas at Cricket Archive

1930 births
Living people
Indian cricketers
Travancore-Cochin cricketers
People from Alappuzha district
Cricketers from Kerala